The 2012/13 NTFL season was the 92nd season of the Northern Territory Football League (NTFL).

St Marys have won there 29th premiership title while defeating the Tiwi Bombers in the grand final by 31 points.

Ladder

Grand Final

References

Northern Territory Football League seasons
NTFL